The sea conger (Ariosoma anagoides), also known as the big-eye conger, is an eel in the family Congridae (conger/garden eels). It was described by Pieter Bleeker in 1853, originally under the genus Conger. It is a tropical, marine eel which is known from the western Pacific Ocean, including Kanagawa Prefecture, Japan; the eastern China Sea, and the East Indies. It leads a benthic lifestyle and dwells in sand and mud. Males can reach a maximum total length of 51 centimeters.

References

External links
 

Ariosoma
Taxa named by Pieter Bleeker
Fish described in 1853